Neil Mitchell (born 10 May 1936) is a South African cricketer. He played in one first-class match for Border in 1954/55.

See also
 List of Border representative cricketers

References

External links
 

1936 births
Living people
South African cricketers
Border cricketers
Place of birth missing (living people)